Psiloscirtus apterus is a species of short-horned grasshopper in the family Acrididae. It is found in Ecuador and Peru.

References

External links

 

Acrididae
Orthoptera of South America
Insects described in 1875
Taxa named by Samuel Hubbard Scudder